Carlos Humberto Cascos (born September 18, 1952) is an American Certified Public Accountant and politician who was the 110th Secretary of State of Texas.  He was appointed by his fellow Republican, Governor Greg Abbott, and was confirmed by the Texas State Senate on February 18, 2015.

References

|-

1952 births
21st-century American politicians
American accountants
American politicians of Mexican descent
County judges in Texas
Living people
People from Brownsville, Texas
People from Matamoros, Tamaulipas
Secretaries of State of Texas
Texas Republicans
McCombs School of Business alumni
Mexican emigrants to the United States